Severe Tropical Cyclone Amos was a strong tropical cyclone that affected the Fijian and Samoan Islands as well as Wallis and Futuna. Amos was first noted as Tropical Disturbance 17F during April 13, 2016 to the northwest of Fiji. The system subsequently moved south-eastwards towards the Fijian Islands, before it passed near or over Vanua Levu during April 16. After passing over Fiji, the system gradually developed further as it moved north-eastwards towards the Samoan Islands. The system was subsequently named Amos during April 20, after it had developed into a tropical cyclone and started to move north-westwards towards the island nation of Tuvalu.

Meteorological history

The system was located underneath an upper level anticyclonic circulation and within an area of low vertical wind shear. Over the next couple of days the system moved westwards, before it started moving south-eastwards towards Fiji during April 15. The system was subsequently classified as a tropical depression on April 16, as passed near or over several islands in Fiji's Northern Division including Vanua Levu. A tropical cyclone formation alert on the system was issued by the United States Joint Typhoon Warning Center during that day, as the well defined low level circulation centre consolidated. The depression subsequently started to move north-westwards towards the island nation of Tuvalu, under the influence of a subtropical ridge of high pressure. The system subsequently passed in between the islands of Wallis and Futuna, as a tropical depression during April 19.

Later that day, the FMS named the depression Amos, after the system had developed into a Category 1 tropical cyclone on the Australian tropical cyclone intensity scale. However, further development of the system at this time was restricted by a trough of low pressure to the northeast of the system, which was causing subsidence over the systems north-eastern quadrant. Amos subsequently slowed down later that day and became nearly stationary, as a near-equatorial ridge of high pressure became the primary steering mechanism. As a result of this new primary steering mechanism, the system turned eastwards and moved towards the Samoan Islands. As the system moved eastwards it started to rapidly intensify further, with an eye feature developing on microwave imagery. Amos subsequently peaked as a Category 3 Severe Tropical Cyclone, with ten-minute sustained wind speeds of  during April 22. Over the next day, the system remained at its peak intensity as it accelerated south-eastwards towards the Samoan Islands, where it was expected to pass over either Upolu or Tutuila. Amos subsequently continued its south-eastwards movement and was thought to have passed very close to or over the Samoan Islands during April 23. The system subsequently significantly weakened over the next day, as the circulation broke down and became sheared. The system subsequently degenerated into a tropical disturbance during April 25, before it was last noted near American Samoa's Manuʻa Islands.

Preparations and impact

Severe Tropical Cyclone Amos affected the island nations of Fiji, Samoa and American Samoa, while the French Territory of Wallis and Futuna was also impacted.

Fiji
The precursor tropical disturbance to Cyclone Amos impacted Fiji between April 15–19, while the island nation was still recovering from the effects of Severe Tropical Cyclones Winston, Zena and Tropical Depressions 14F/15F. As the system impacting the island nation, the Fiji Meteorological Service issued strong wind and heavy rain warnings, for the whole of the archipelago including Rotuma. Flood warnings were also issued for parts of Vanua Levu including the Labasa, Qawa and Rakiraki Rivers and Labasa. The disturbance subsequently passed near or over several islands, in Fiji's Northern Division including Vanua Levu during April 16. The system brought several periods of heavy rain and strong winds to most of the Fijian Islands, with severe flooding reported on Vanua Levu during April 17.

Wallis and Futuna
As Amos approached Wallis and Futuna, the Meteo-France NC issued an Alert 1 for the islands, which was later upgraded to an Alert 2. Very heavy rains affected Wallis and Futuna as Amos made its closest approach to the islands.

Samoa
Since Amos was forecast to hit Samoa as a Category 4 storm on April 24, emergency preparations went underway with water and generators being distributed. A total of 63 residents were evacuated prior to the storm. Despite the forecasts however, the impacts from Amos were not as severe as initially predicted. The most severe damage occurred in Savai'i where roads were damaged due to flooding. In addition, it is estimated that about 70 percent of the island nation lost electricity during the storm due to high winds.

American Samoa
On April 23, the Joint Typhoon Warning Center issued forecasts that indicated that Amos would pass directly over American Samoa by April 24. However, a recalculation in the storm position on April 24 altered the forecast track, sparing Pago Pago from a direct hit from Amos. Amos brushed American Samoa to the north, dumping just over three inches of rain over Pago Pago. Amos was the strongest tropical cyclone to affect Samoa and American Samoa since Cyclone Evan in December 2012. Only three cyclones have tracked near American Samoa since 1959.

See also
Cyclone Evan
Cyclone Val
Cyclone Ofa

References

External links

Tropical cyclones in Fiji
Tropical cyclones in Wallis and Futuna
Tropical cyclones in Samoa
Tropical cyclones in American Samoa
2016 in Fiji
2016 in Samoa
2016 in American Samoa
Category 3 South Pacific cyclones
2015–16 South Pacific cyclone season
April 2016 events
Amos